was a Japanese potter. He had a significant influence on studio pottery of the twentieth century, and a major figure of the mingei (folk-art) movement, establishing the town of Mashiko as a world-renowned pottery centre. In 1955 he was designated a "Living National Treasure".

Biography 
Hamada was born in Kawasaki, Japan, in 1894, and was named .

After finishing his studies at the elite Hibiya High School, he studied ceramics at Tokyo Institute of Technology, then known as Tokyo Industrial College with Kawai Kanjirō under Itaya Hazan. As the sole students in the school interested in becoming artist-potters, Hamada and the slightly elder Kawai were soon friends, touring the city in search of inspiration. They worked together in Kyoto at the former body of the Kyoto Municipal Institute of Industrial Technology and Culture where they experimented on glazes using various minerals. They were acquainted by Yanagi Sōetsu and Tomimoto Kenkichi while visiting potteries and exhibitions.

Hamada was deeply impressed by a Tokyo exhibition of ceramic art by Bernard Leach, who was then staying with Yanagi Sōetsu, and wrote to Leach seeking an introduction. The two found much in common and became good friends, so much so that Hamada asked and was granted permission to accompany Leach to England in 1920 when the latter decided to return and establish a pottery there.

Pottery in Mashiko 
Here, he built his own pottery and committed himself to using only locally sourced materials, not only in the clay he used, but also the glazes he created and  the brushes he manufactured himself from dog hair and bamboo.

In 1955 the Japanese government designated him "Living National Treasure", the first time for someone from the field of crafts. The previous year on 29 May 1954, the Cultural Property Protection Act had been amended, and a new Preservers of Important Intangible Cultural Properties (Jūyō Mukei Bunkazai Hojisha) designation was passed the bill in November for its criteria and approval details.

Following Yanagi Muneyoshi, Hamada was enthusiastic about folk art movement in Japan. When Yanagi died in 1961, he succeeded as the second director of the Japanese Folk Crafts Museum, and in 1977, he opened his own museum at his home, Mashiko Sankōkan (present Shoji Hamada Memorial Mashiko Sankokan Museum), and exhibited his collection of folk crafts from Japan and abroad.

Hamada Shoji was very supportive of young artists who moved to Mashiko such as his student Shimaoka Tatsuzō, and Kamoda Shōji, and was also important in establishing Mashiko as a destination for day tourism. He provided housing and hosted workplace for visiting potters from abroad as well.

Hamada died in Mashiko on January 5, 1978.

Preserving local architecture 

Since he moved to Mashiko, Hamada bought, relocated, and refurbished traditional farm houses, stone warehouses, and nagaya-mon gatehouses of Edo period unique to southern Tochigi Prefecture on his property. The first was his residence in 1930, followed by others he used as workshops and for entertaining guests and apprentices, with the last one used since 1942 as his workshop. In 1989 his residence was donated to and rebuilt at Mashiko Museum of Ceramic Art, or Ceramic Art Messe Mashiko, after the house was designated a cultural property of Mashiko. The museum is still open today and visitors can view Hamada's studio, living quarters, and various craft collections.

Influence 
Throughout a lifetime dedicated to making pottery he achieved international recognition and his works have been collected by museums across the world. Hamada’s influence was felt not only in his native Japan, particularly in Mashiko, but also in the West. In the United Kingdom and the US, his style and philosophy became well known amongst studio potters, and he was revered as the archetypal "Oriental" potter.

Today Hamada's works attain high prices at auction. In the UK, examples of his work can be seen at the York Art Gallery.

Awards and merits 
Living National Treasure in 1955
Medals of Honor (Japan), Purple Ribbon in 1964
Order of Culture in 1968
Degrees
Honorary degree in arts, Royal College of Art

Further reading

Books

Hamada's own works 

 With time table by Mizuo Hiroshi, pp. 336–341
 With time table by Mizuo Hiroshi, pp. 185–204.

Works by others 

 246 pp. Ill., ports.; 21 cm.
 239 pp. Ill. (some col.); 27 cm. 
 232 pp. Ill. (some col.); 26 cm.

Exhibition catalogs

Audio visual materials

Videos 

 Mashiko village pottery, Japan, 1937 [videorecording]: pottery-making in Japan.1 videocassette (VHS) (22 min.): si., black and white; 1/2 in. Shows the pottery techniques used by Mashiko potters. From the 1850s, these potters produced utilitarian ware for local markets, but the post-war period saw a change with the influence of renowned potter, Shoji Hamada. Held at University of Tasmania & Edith Cowan University. Edith Cowan University Library
 The Potters' Society of Australia presents Shoji Hamada [videorecording]. Sydney: Closed Circuit Television, University of New South Wales, 1965. 1 videocassette (VHS)(50 min): sd., black and white; 1/2.Famous Japanese artist potter, Shoji Hamada demonstrates his unique techniques. Held in The University of Sydney. University of Sydney Library.
 The Potters' Society of Australia presents...Shoji Hamada [videorecording]. Kensington, NSW: University of New South Wales. Audio Visual Unit, (198?)1 videocassette (VHS) (55 min.): sd., black and white; 1/2 in. Held in University of Newcastle. University of Newcastle Library
 Shoji Hamada [videorecording]: a demonstration by Shoji Hamada.Audio-Visual Unit, UNSW, 1984. 1 videocassette (VHS) (48 min.): sd., black and white; 1/2 in. Held in Southern Cross University. University Library Lismore.
 Shoji Hamada [videorecording]: a potter's way and work / written and narrated by Susan Peterson. New York: Weatherhill Press, 1995, c. 1996. 1 videocassette (VHS)(027 min.): sd., col.; 1/2 in.

Films 

 Three potters throwing. [Motion picture]. Research & Education Dept, American Crafts Council, 1958. 20 mins: si. color; 16 mm.
 Fingers and Clay. 1 film reel (11 mins): sd., black and white; 16 mm. Producer, Malcolm Otton; director, editor, Christopher Cordeaux; script, J. Hawes; photographers, Edward Cranstone, Tom Cowan; sound, Gordon Wraxall.
 The art of the potter. [Motion picture] / Sidney Reichman and David Outerbridge. New York : Phoenix Films, 1977. 2 reels, 50 mins: sd., col.; 16 mm.

Slides 

 Shoji Hamada [Pottery] [slide]. Tanyard, Wilts: Slides for Potters, [197-]. Held in The University of Melbourne. 23 slides: col. & + guide (Set 19). The University Library.

Footnotes

References

External links
Shoji Hamada Memorial Mashiko Sankokan Museum stands on the site of Hamada's home and holds workshops.  
Mashiko Museum of Ceramic Art showcases ceramicists in Mashiko including residency program attendees. Reserves Hamada's house as a historical architecture. 
The Museum of New Zealand Te Papa Tongarewa holds a collection of works by Shōji Hamada. 
Gallery Oldham, Greater Manchester holds works by Shoji Hamada.

1894 births
1978 deaths
People from Tokyo
Japanese potters
Living National Treasures of Japan
Tokyo Institute of Technology alumni
20th-century ceramists
Artists
Mingei